Robert or Bob Reid may refer to:

Art and architecture
Robert Reid (architect) (1774–1856), Scottish architect
Robert Payton Reid (1859–1945), Scottish academic painter
Robert Reid (American painter) (1862–1929), American impressionist painter
Robert Russell Reid (born 1927), Canadian typographer and designer

Business
Robert Reid (antiquarian) (1773–1865), Scottish businessman and topographer
Sir Robert Gillespie Reid (1842–1908), Scottish railway contractor
Sir Robert Reid (railwayman) (1921–1993), chairman of British Rail
Sir Bob Reid (businessman) (born 1934), Chairman of the British Railways Board
Robert Reid (author) (born 1966), American author

Engineering and science
Robert Carstairs Reid (1845–1894), Scottish civil engineer
Robert Reid (chemical engineer) (1924–2006), American chemical engineer in thermodynamics

Politics and government
Robert R. Reid (1789–1841), U.S. Representative, territorial governor of Florida
Robert Dyce Reid (1829–1900), Australian pastoralist and member of the Victorian Legislative Council
Robert Reid (Kirkcaldy Burghs MP) (1831–1875), British Member of Parliament for Kirkcaldy Burghs, 1874–1875
Robert Reid (New Zealand politician) (1839–1897)
Robert Reid (Australian politician, born 1842) (1842–1904), merchant and member of the Victorian Legislative Council and Australian Senate
Robert Reid, 1st Earl Loreburn (1846–1923), British Liberal politician, Lord Chancellor
Sir Robert Reid (civil servant) (1883–1964), British colonial administrator in India

Sports
Bob Reid (footballer, born 1887) (1887–1998), Scottish footballer who played for Burnley, Huddersfield Town, and Southend United
Robert Reid (Scottish footballer) (fl. 1913–1918)
Robert Reid (cross-country skier) (1898–1990), American Olympic skier
Bob Reid (Australian footballer) (born 1924), Australian rules footballer
Robert Reid (ice hockey) (1932–2007), Australian ice hockey player
Robert Reid (basketball) (born 1955), American basketball player
Robert Reid (co-driver) (born 1966), Scottish world champion rally co-driver

Others
Robert Reid (bishop) (died 1558), Scottish abbot and bishop, founder of the University of Edinburgh
Robert Reid (pipemaker) (1784–1837), Northumbrian smallpipes creator
Robert Reid (Medal of Honor) (1842–1929), American Civil War soldier and Medal of Honor recipient
Robert Reid (judge) (1855–1923), Justice of the Louisiana Supreme Court
Robert Lovell Reid (1921–1996), Australian agriculturalist

See also
Robert Read (1814–1896), Canadian businessman and politician
Robert Reed (disambiguation)
Bert Reid (disambiguation)
Bobby Reid (disambiguation)
Robert Reid-Pharr, American literary and cultural critic